James Asbury Leftwich, Jr. (born December 11, 1962) is an American politician from Virginia. A member of the Republican Party, Leftwich is a member of the Virginia House of Delegates for the 78th district. Leftwich was a member of the Chesapeake School Board.

Leftwich is a member of the Counties, Cities and Towns Committees, Courts of Justice Committee, and General Laws Committee. He was promoted to the chair of the General Laws Committee in 2022.

References

External links
 

Living people
Republican Party members of the Virginia House of Delegates
1962 births
21st-century American politicians
School board members in Virginia
Politicians from Chesapeake, Virginia